A list of proposed, planned and under construction transport developments in the East of England region in a sortable table. Following the 2010 general election the new government's Comprehensive Spending Review, many unstarted projects have been reassessed for feasibility, with an eye to save money due to the late 2000s recession. Some schemes have since been given a go ahead, or cut from plans, however many are still waiting till January 2011 to know what decisions have been reached on them.

References